Pethalur is a village in the Gadag district of Karnataka State in India.

See also
 Lakkundi
 Dambal
 Hombal
 Harti (Gadag district) 
 Gadag

References

Villages in Gadag district